The Savena is a river in the Tuscany and Emilia-Romagna regions of Italy. The source of the river is in the province of Florence west of Firenzuola in the Appennino Tosco-Emiliano mountains. The river flows north into the province of Bologna and flows near Monghidoro, Loiano, Pianoro and San Lazzaro di Savena before curving east and flowing into the Idice east of Bologna.

References

Rivers of the Province of Florence
Rivers of the Province of Bologna
Rivers of the Apennines
Rivers of Italy